The United States Air Force's 281st Combat Communications Group was a Rhode Island Air National Guard combat communications unit located in North Smithfield, Rhode Island, United States.

Mission

Federal: To install, operate, and maintain combat-ready equipment and personnel packages, to provide deployable communications and information (C&I) capability in support of the United States Air Force Joint Forces Air Component Commander (JFACC) and the Air Force Forces (AFFOR) Commander.

State: To be organized, equipped, and trained to function effectively in the protection of life, property and the preservation of peace, order, and public safety under competent orders of Rhode Island state authorities.

History

The 281st Combat Communications Group (281 CCG) was established as the 281st Tactical Air Control Group on 1 April 1976. The Group Headquarters, the 282 Combat Communications Squadron (CBCS), and the 283 CBCS were formerly Tactical Air Control units. The 263 CBCS was assigned to the Group in 1988. In 1993, the 118 CBCS was assigned to the Group Hqs. The 118th was a NATO Air Base Support (NABS) organization and recently converted to an Initial Beddown mission in NATO. The MRC-113 was the largest and had the longest range and channel capacity of any USAF Tactical Wideband radio system. The TSC-38B provided secure record traffic and a telephone switch in addition to its HF radio capabilities. The 263 CBCS was part of the 251CCG from Springfield, Ohio and had the contingency squadron mission. They possessed a variety of analog communications equipment, including high frequency and line-of-sight radios, technical control, record communications center, tactical switchboards, and a Digital Subscriber Terminal. In 1985, the 281 CCG was selected as the USAF Component of the Tactical Contingency Communications Equipment – Central Area (TCCE-CA) in support of the United States Central Command (USCENTCOM).

Assignments

Major Command/Gaining Command

Air National Guard/Air Force Space Command (2008 – 30 Sep 2013)
Air National Guard/Air Combat Command (1 June 1992 – 2008)
Air National Guard/Tactical Air Command (1976 – 1 June 1992)

Previous designations

 281st Combat Communications Group (???–30 Sep 2013)

Squadrons previously assigned
 202nd Engineering and Installation Squadron
 213th Engineering and Installation Squadron
 263d Combat Communications Squadron—New London, North Carolina
 265th Combat Communications Squadron—South Portland, Maine 
 267th Combat Communications Squadron—Otis ANGB, Massachusetts
 269th Combat Communications Squadron—Springfield, Ohio
 271st Combat Communications Squadron—Annville, Pennsylvania
 282d Combat Communications Squadron—North Smithfield, Rhode Island
 283d Combat Communications Squadron—Marietta, Georgia

Bases stationed

 Coventry, Rhode Island (2006?–30 Sep 2013)
 North Smithfield, Rhode Island (1976–2013)

References

External links
 Globalsecurity.org: 281st CCG

Combat Communications 281
Military units and formations in Rhode Island
Combat Communications 281